Larva currens (Latin for racing larva) is an itchy, cutaneous condition caused by infections with Strongyloides stercoralis. It is caused by the intradermal migration of strongyloides and distinguished from cutaneous larva migrans (caused by hookworm) by its rapid migration, perianal involvement and wide band of urticaria.

See also 
 List of cutaneous conditions
 List of migrating cutaneous conditions
 Ground itch

References 

Parasitic infestations, stings, and bites of the skin